The 2018 South American Under-18 Futsal Championship  was the 2nd edition of the South American Under-18 Futsal Championship, the biennial international youth futsal championship organised by the CONMEBOL for the men's under-18 national teams of South America. The tournament was held in Luque, Paraguay between 22–29 March 2018. Different from the first edition, it was played as an under-18 tournament instead of an under-17 tournament.

The tournament served as qualifying for the futsal tournament at the 2018 Summer Youth Olympics in Buenos Aires, with the winner qualifying for the boys' tournament together with hosts Argentina which qualified automatically (if Argentina were to win the tournament, the runner-up would qualify)

Teams
All ten CONMEBOL member national teams entered the tournament.

 (title holders)

 (hosts)

Venues
All matches are played in one venue: Centro de Entrenamiento Olímpico in Luque.

Draw
The draw of the tournament was held on 19 March 2018, 11:30 PYST (UTC−3), at the headquarters of the Paraguayan Football Association in Asunción. The ten teams were drawn into two groups of five teams. The hosts Paraguay and the defending champions Brazil were seeded into Groups A and B respectively, while the remaining teams were placed into four "pairing pots" according to their results in the 2016 South American Under-17 Futsal Championship: Argentina–Venezuela, Peru–Ecuador, Uruguay–Bolivia, Chile–Colombia.

Squads
Each team had to submit a squad of 12 players, including a minimum of two goalkeepers (Regulations Article 4.1). Players born on or after 1 January 2000 are eligible to compete in the tournament.

Group stage
The top two teams of each group advance to the semi-finals, while the teams in third, fourth and fifth advance to the fifth place, seventh place, and ninth place play-offs respectively. The teams are ranked according to points (3 points for a win, 1 point for a draw, 0 points for a loss). If tied on points, tiebreakers are applied in the following order (Regulations Article 6.2):
Results in head-to-head matches between tied teams (points, goal difference, goals scored);
Goal difference in all matches;
Goals scored in all matches;
Red cards in all matches;
Yellow cards in all matches
Drawing of lots.

All times are local, PYST (UTC−3) until 24 March 2018, PYT (UTC−4) from 25 March 2018.

Group A

Group B

Knockout stage
In the semi-finals and final, extra time and penalty shoot-out are used to decide the winner if necessary.

Bracket

Ninth place play-off

Seventh place play-off

Fifth place play-off

Semi-finals

Third place play-off

Final
Winner qualifies for 2018 Summer Youth Olympics boys' futsal tournament.

Final ranking

Qualified teams for Youth Olympics
The following two teams from CONMEBOL qualified for the 2018 Summer Youth Olympics boys' futsal tournament, including Argentina which qualified as hosts.

Notes
Since teams from the same association cannot play in both the Youth Olympics boys' and girls' tournaments, if teams from the same association qualify for both tournaments, they must nominate their preferred qualification team, and the next best ranked team will qualify instead if one of the qualified teams are not nominated.
As participation in team sports (Futsal, Beach handball, Field hockey, and Rugby sevens) are limited to one team per gender for each National Olympic Committee (NOC), the participating teams of the 2018 Youth Olympics futsal tournament will be confirmed by mid-2018 after each qualified NOC confirms their participation and any unused qualification places are reallocated.

References

External links
Sudamericano Sub 18 de Futsal Paraguay 2018
Sudamericano Sub 18., Twitter.com

Conmebol Boys
2018 Under-18
2018 in South American futsal
2018 in Paraguayan football
March 2018 sports events in South America
2018 South American Under-18 Futsal Championship